is a town located in Nishisonogi District, Nagasaki Prefecture, Japan. As of March 31, 2017, the town has an estimated population of 30,084 and a density of 1,500 persons per km². The total area is 20.73 km².

Neighbouring the town of Nagayo, Togitsu is notable for having a wide variety of retail stores and serves as a regional shopping centre for the Nishisonogi district of Nagasaki prefecture.

Geography

Surrounding municipalities 

 Nagasaki
 Nagayo

Education 
Togitsu has a high school, the Seiun Gakuen Junior and Senior High School, three junior high schools (including Seiun) and four primary schools.

Transportation 
Togitsu does not have any train station nor any railway, with the closest ones being either Michinoo Station in Nagasaki or Nagayo Station in neighbouring Nagayo. It is served by a local bus system that goes within Togitsu and to Nagasaki City, Nagasaki Airport and Nagayo

Highways 

 Japan national routes
 Route 206
 Route 207

References

External links

 
 Togitsu official website 

Towns in Nagasaki Prefecture